William White Anderson MC (1888–1956) was a Scottish minister who served as Moderator of the General Assembly of the Church of Scotland in 1951. He was Chaplain in Scotland to both King George VI and Queen Elizabeth II.

Life

He was born on 17 March 1888 in Bo'ness. He was educated at Bo'ness Academy and then studied divinity at Glasgow University.

In 1912 he went to New Brunswick in Canada to run a mission. In the First World War he served as a Senior Chaplain to the British 9th Division. He won the Military Cross in 1917.

In 1919 he returned to Glasgow as minister of Bellahouston Church. In 1926 he transferred to New Kilpatrick Church in Bearsden in northwest Glasgow. In 1931 he moved to Edinburgh as an assistant minister of St Cuthberts at the west end of Princes Street Gardens. Later promoted to Senior Minister he remained there for the rest of his working life.

He died on 17 December 1956.

References

1888 births
1956 deaths
Alumni of the University of Glasgow
20th-century Ministers of the Church of Scotland
Moderators of the General Assembly of the Church of Scotland
Recipients of the Military Cross
People from Bo'ness
Scottish expatriates in Canada
British Army personnel of World War I